John Dixon Bridgers II (January 13, 1922 – November 24, 2006) was an American football coach and college athletics administrator.  He served as the head football coach at Johns Hopkins University from 1953 to 1956 and at Baylor University from 1959 to 1968, compiling a career college football record of 59–74–2.  Bridgers was the athletic director at Florida State University from 1973 to 1979 and at the University of New Mexico from 1979 to 1987.  He also worked as an assistant coach in the National Football League with the Baltimore Colts (1957–1958) and Pittsburgh Steelers (1969).

Coaching career
Bridgers began his career as an assistant coach at the Sewanee: The University of the South (1947–1951), was head coach for the First Cavalry Division Artillery Team in Hokkaido, Japan in 1952 and was head football and track coach at Johns Hopkins University in Baltimore from 1953 to 1956.  In 1957 and 1958 he served as a coach/coordinator for the Baltimore Colts, where he developed their pro-style offense attack. He carried that style with him in 1959, coming to Baylor to replace the fired Sam Boyd.

During his Baylor tenure, he compiled a 49–53–1 (.481) record. In his first five seasons, he led the Bears to three bowl games, winning two of them. He installed the Colts' wide-open passing game at Baylor, helping make All-Americans of quarterback Don Trull and wide receiver Lawrence Elkins after a record-breaking 1963 season. In the Bears' 1966 season opener against Syracuse at Baylor Stadium, Bridgers sent in John Hill Westbrook, making the sophomore running back the first black athlete to play for a Southwest Conference school. 

Bridgers spent a year on Chuck Noll's first Pittsburgh Steelers staff, where he urged the coach to consider drafting a player he tried to recruit for Baylor, a quarterback named Terry Bradshaw. After the Steelers took Bradshaw with the first overall pick in the 1970 NFL Draft they won four Super Bowls in the next decade.

Administrative career
After Bridgers left Pittsburgh for an assistant's job at the University of South Carolina, he became athletic director at Florida State University in 1973. Despite inheriting a $1 million athletic deficit, he turned the program around with the single most important hire in school history, convincing another talented coach from Alabama, Hall of Famer Bobby Bowden to leave West Virginia for the Seminoles.  Turning around another struggling athletic program, Bridgers left Florida State for the University of New Mexico in 1979, where his win brother Frank was a principal of a major engineering firm. He encountered a program where major NCAA infractions had surfaced in the basketball program under Norm Ellenberger, prompting an FBI investigation into transcript-rigging. Bridgers turned the scandal-ridden program around by hiring Gary Colson, and headed the athletic department as the football Lobos under Joe Morrison enjoyed a 10–1 season in 1982.

Death
Bridgers died in Albuquerque, New Mexico of congestive heart failure at the age of 84.

Head coaching record

References

1922 births
2006 deaths
Auburn Tigers football coaches
Baltimore Colts coaches
Baylor Bears athletic directors
Baylor Bears football coaches
Florida State Seminoles athletic directors
Johns Hopkins Blue Jays football coaches
New Mexico Lobos athletic directors
Pittsburgh Steelers coaches
Sewanee Tigers football coaches
South Carolina Gamecocks football coaches
College track and field coaches in the United States
Sportspeople from Birmingham, Alabama